The power grid of Vancouver Island is owned and operated by BC Hydro, and is connected with that of the Mainland of British Columbia by high voltage AC submarine cables, and formerly by a DC submarine cable system.

These links, which all consist of overhead line sections on land together with submarine cables are:
 HVAC 525kV,  Two parallel circuits from south of Powell River to Vancouver Island in two cable and three overhead sections with reactor station on Texada Island.
 One 138 kV. and one 230kV. AC lines running from Arnott substation in Delta to Vancouver Island Terminal in North Cowichan (the same points that HVDC Vancouver Island connects). Waypoints of these southern lines, which all consist of three overhead and two submarine cable sections are:

The former * HVDC Vancouver Island was capable of transferring a total of 700 MW (now obsolete and de-energized).

 A 525 kV link consisting of two parallel lines running to the midpoint of Vancouver Island.

See also 
 List of high voltage underground and submarine cables
 HVDC Vancouver Island

References

Energy in British Columbia
Electric power infrastructure in Canada